All or Nothing is a 2002 British drama film written and directed by Mike Leigh and starring Timothy Spall, Lesley Manville and a young James Corden. Like much of Leigh's work, the film is set in present-day London, and depicts three working-class families and their everyday lives.

Synopsis
The film begins with a day nearing its end. Rachel, the daughter in the first family, is shown working in a nursing home. Phil, her father, is seen driving people around in his minicab. Penny, Rachel's mother, is shown working as a cashier at a Safeway store alongside Maureen, the mother in the second family. When Penny leaves work, she cycles home to find her 18-year-old son Rory in a fight with a local boy for taking his football.

Rory is a lazy, obese, ill-mannered teenager who neither goes to school nor has a job. Complications with his obesity arise when after an altercation with a gang of youths playing piggy in the middle, he runs out of breath, begins to hyperventilate and is hospitalized after suffering a heart attack.

The second family consists of Maureen, another cashier at Safeway, and her daughter Donna, a waitress at a cafe. Donna becomes pregnant by her boyfriend Jason despite being on the pill, and this leads to a heated argument among the three characters.

The third family consists of Ron, who also drives a minicab, his unemployed teenage daughter Samantha, and his wife Carol, an unemployed alcoholic. Samantha shows interest in both Jason and Craig, a taciturn young man who seems to stalk her.

Cast

 Timothy Spall as Phil
 Lesley Manville as Penny
 James Corden as Rory
 Alison Garland as Rachel
 Ruth Sheen as Maureen
 Marion Bailey as Carol
 Paul Jesson as Ron
 Sam Kelly as Sid
 Kathryn Hunter as Cécile
 Sally Hawkins as Samantha
 Helen Coker as Donna
 Daniel Mays as Jason
 Ben Crompton as Craig
 Robert Wilfort as Dr. Simon Griffith
 Gary McDonald as Neville
 Dorothy Atkinson as A Silent Passenger
 Alan Williams as Drunk

Film locations
Dungeness in Kent was used as a film location for the scene where Phil visits the coast to contemplate his problems.

Reception
It was well received by critics and audiences alike, receiving an 82% fresh rating on Rotten Tomatoes, based on 92 reviews, with an average rating of 7.1/10. The critical consensus states that "All or Nothing's depiction of the working-class can be depressingly bleak, but the performances are wonderfully true to life." It has a 72/100 average on Metacritic. The film holds an average B+ grade on Yahoo! Movies.

Awards
The film won the London Film Critics Circle Award for Best British Film of the Year, and Mike Leigh was nominated for Best Director at the European Film Awards. The film was nominated for the Palme d'Or at the 2002 Cannes Film Festival.

References

External links

 All or Nothing at BFI Screenonline

2002 films
2002 drama films
Films about dysfunctional families
Films directed by Mike Leigh
Films set in London
StudioCanal films
United Artists films
British drama films
2000s English-language films
2000s British films